The Iraqi Intelligence Service also known as the Mukhabarat, General Intelligence Directorate, or Party Intelligence, was an 8,000-man agency and the main state intelligence organization in Iraq under Saddam Hussein. The IIS was primarily concerned with international intelligence collection and analysis but also performed many activities inside Iraq in conjunction with the Directorate of General Security as a secret police organization.

The most important section of the IIS was Directorate 4: the Secret Service. One of the well known Directors was Rafi' Dahham Mejwel Al-Tikriti  the former Iraqi Ambassador to Turkey and the last Chief of the Iraqi Intelligence Service. The Secret Service was tasked with infiltrating both foreign and domestic governments, unions, embassies, and opposition groups. IIS often worked closely with the Iraqi General Security Directorate (the Iraqi equivalent of the FBI) when conducting domestic activities.

IIS is alleged to be responsible for a number of assassinations and attempted assassinations abroad. These include the assassinations of former Iraqi prime minister Abd ar-Razzaq an-Naif in London (July 1978), Salih Mahdi Ammash in Helsinki (January 1985), Sheikh Talib al-Suhail al-Tamimi in Beirut (April 1994), Ayatollah Mehdi al-Hakim in Sudan (January 1988) and Ayad Habashi in Rome (October 1986), as well as the attempted assassinations of President George H. W. Bush, the Emir of Kuwait and the former Iraqi Prime Minister Ayad Allawi.

Structure 

IIS was organised as a number of Bureaus, which oversaw the individual directorates. The following list gives the directorates divided by bureau, and a brief description of the directorate:

Political Bureau 

Directorate 4 – Secret Service
Located inside the headquarters of the IIS, Directorate 4's activities took place in both Iraq and abroad, with agents infiltrated within Iraqi government departments, the Ba'ath Party, associations, unions and organizations, Iraqi embassies and opposition parties. In addition, the Secret Service received information from the Al Hadi Project. The directorate included a number of offices responsible for the collection of information about a specific country or region. These offices included areas for Southeast Asia, Turkey, Iran, America (North and South), Europe, Arab states, Africa and the former Soviet Union. Directorate 4 worked in coordination with Directorates 3, 5, 9, 12, 14 and 18. The last director of Directorate 4 was BG Mohammed Yasin Al Shammari from Mosul.

Directorate 8 – Technical Affairs
Located in the headquarters of the ISS, Directorate 8 was responsible for the fingerprinting of all IIS employees and the development of materials needed for covert offensive operations. These included weapons, explosives and poisons. Directorate 8 also assembled cameras, communications equipment and employed many engineers and scientists with advanced degrees. The last director of Directorate 8 was Mohammed al-Masri, who was of Egyptian origin.

Directorate 9 – Secret Operations
One of the most important directorates within the IIS. Directorate 9's work was mostly outside Iraq in coordination with Directorates 5, 12, 14 and 18, focusing on operations of sabotage and assassination. The last director of Directorate 9 was MG Abdul Hameed Khalaf al-Bayati, with BG Hussain Abdul Khaliq ad-Douri, from Dour as his Assistant Director.

Directorate 12 – Electronic Surveillance
Responsible for the planting, monitoring, and analyzing video and audio surveillance devices within the IIS. Also partially responsible for the forging of currency.

Directorate 17 – National Security Institute
Responsible for the training of IIS officers. Located in the Jihad district (possibly at Abu Ghraib in the western suburbs of Baghdad), it contained full living quarters and a supermarket. High-school graduates undertook a three-year course, and college graduates an 18-month course prior to entering the intelligence service as junior officers.

Planning Office
Responsible for collecting and analyzing information from around the world, including open sources such as radio, satellite TV, and newspapers.

Propaganda Office
Responsible for conducting psychological warfare operations, including the dissemination of false information.

Special Bureau 

Directorate 5 – Counter-Intelligence
Responsible for the detection and neutralization of foreign intelligence agents, with a particular focus on Syrian infiltrators. Directorate 5 works in conjunction with Directorates 3, 4, 14 and 18. Undated sources name BG Sadoon Ali al-Tikriti, from Auja as director of Directorate 5, and LTC Ahmed Lahij ad-Dulaimi as Assistant Director.

Directorate 6 – Mukhabarat Security
Responsible for the conduct of officers and other members of the ISS. Directorate 6 was responsible for the issuing of papers, passports, and marriage sanctions for all ISS employees. The last director of Directorate 6 was MG Abdul Hameed Yasin al-Ghurairi, with COL Ibrahim al-`Aani as his Assistant.

Directorate 7 – Al Haakimiya
The primary interrogation center of the ISS was Al Haakimiya, located opposite the Passport Office on 52nd Street.

Directorate 19 – Personnel Supervision
Responsible for surveillance of IIS employees.

Directorate 22 – Protection
Responsible for personal protection of senior IIS officials and visiting dignitaries.

Office 16
Uncertain designation. Conducted training of agents for the Clandestine operations abroad.

Brigade of Mukhabarat
Rapid intervention force of the IIS, armed with light and semi-heavy weapons.

Administration Bureau 

Directorate 2 – Administration

Responsible for all administrative affairs. Directorate 2 was divided into a number of subdivisions:
Payments and Gifts
Land and Housing
Audit
Security
Registry
Word Processing and Typing
Public Enquiries

Directorate 10 – Legal Directorate

Charged with all IIS legal matters. Represents the IIS on joint committees with other government departments and ministries. Also contained the court where IIS prisoners were tried. The last director of Directorate 10 was BG Kamel Qurtasi al-Jenabi, with COL Saadoun Mohammed al-Mashhadani as his Assistant Director.

Directorate 11 – Accounts
Located in the headquarters complex. Responsible for financial affairs, and the salaries of all directorates except Directorate 1.

Directorate 13 – Medical
Located in the headquarters complex. Responsible for medical examinations of new recruits and medical care for members of the IIS.

Directorate 15 – Vehicles
Responsible for the vehicles of the IIS and their maintenance.

Directorate 16 – Physical Plant
Responsible for the maintenance, repair, and cleaning of all IIS buildings.

Directorate 20 – Printing
Responsible for printing leaflets, books, and forged documents (including passports).

Directorate 27 – Engineering And Construction
Responsible for the construction of IIS buildings and housing for senior officers.

Directorate 1 – The Private Office

The office of the director of the Mukhabarat was situated in its own building at the main entrance of the Mukhabarat complex in the Mansour district of Baghdad. All instructions and directives flowed from this office, and the director's meetings with his senior staff took place here. The last Director of the Mukhabarat was Rafi' Dahham Al Tikriti, former director of the Fourth Directorate of the Mukhabarat and former Iraqi Ambassador in Turkey. He assumed his present position on 1 July 1997. The Director up to 30 June 1997 was Mani' Abd Rashid Al Tikriti. The Manager of the Director's Office is Col. `Aayed Al Douri (Abu Tayseer), from Dour, and the Director's secretary is Capt. Muthana Al Tikriti (nephew of Mani' Abd Rashid).

Subdivisions of D1:

The Secretariat
Audit
Security
Salaries
Electronic equipment
Reception and appointments
Internal and external co-ordination

Directorate 3 – Surveillance

Situated in the National Security Institute in the Jihad District of Baghdad, Directorate 3 was divided into three subdivisions: mobile surveillance (close pursuit of targets with vehicles); foot surveillance; and stationary surveillance (surveillance of a fixed premises such as a kiosk or shop). The last known director for Directorate 3 was BG Mohammed ad-Douri (Abu Nihad), from Dour, and the last known Assistant Director was LTC Subhi Ibrahim al-Jibouri, from Baiji/Al Siniya.

Directorate 14 – Special Operations

One of the largest and most important directorates within the IIS, Directorate 14 was responsible for the most secret and sensitive operations undertaken outside of Iraq. Directorate 14 was also responsible for the training of officers for operations of this nature. The last known director for Directorate 14 was BG Nouri ad-Douri (Abu Ibrahim) from Jadriya.

Directorate 18 – Iran

Responsible for the Mujahideen Khalq Organisation (MKO). Directorate 18 issues the orders and tasks for MKO operations in Iraq, Iran, and other countries. The last known director for Directorate 18 was BG Ihsan al-Timmimi (Syed Ihsan), with COL Ali Bilal Hussein ad-Dulaimi as his Assistant Director.

Directorate 21 – Residency

Responsible for monitoring the residence permits of foreigners and Arabs in Iraq. Directorate 21 was headquartered in the Karradeh District of Baghdad.

Directorate 23 – Southern District

Headquartered in Basra, Directorate 23 was responsible for positions and operations in the south of Iraq. It was charged with following political events and infiltrating countries neighboring southern Iraq.

Directorate 24 – Northern District

Headquartered in Mosul with an office in Kirkuk, Directorate 24 was responsible for operations in northern Iraq. Also responsible for infiltrating opposition groups in northern Iraq.

Directorate 25 – Western District

Headquartered in Ramadi, Directorate 24 was responsible for operations and recruitment of agents in Syria and Jordan. Also responsible for gun-running and smuggling across the border, and coordinating with opposition parties. The last known director of Directorate 25 was BG Jamal Amr al-Rawi from Rawa

Directorate 26 – Eastern District

Headquartered in Karbala, Directorate 26 was responsible for operations in the Karbala Governorate.

Directorate 28 – Security of MIO

Directorate 28 was responsible for the security of all Military Industrialization Organization facilities. It was established after the defection of Hussein Kamel al-Majid in August 1995.

History 

Following an unsuccessful assassination attempt by the Ba'ath Party on Iraq's ruler Abdul Karim Qasim in October 1959, Saddam Hussein was placed in charge of Jihaz al Khas (Special Apparatus), sometime between 1964 and 1966. Codenamed Jihaz al-Haneen (Instrument of Yearning), the organisation concentrated on security and intelligence work.

After the Ba'ath Party seized power on 17 July 1968, Saddam expanded the Special Apparatus and took control of the Amn (State Internal Security Department).

Following the failed coup attempt led by Director of Internal Security Nadhim Kzar in 1973, Jihaz was transformed into Da'irat al Mukhabarat al Amah (The General Intelligence Department or the GID).

In 1983, under the leadership of Barzan Ibrahim al-Tikriti, the GID organized the massacres of the villagers of Dujail and Jezan Al Chol, the disappearance of the Barzanis from the Qushtapa camp, and the assassination of 18 members of Ayatollah Mohammed Baqir al-Hakim's family.

As a result of the Gulf War (1991), the department dealing with external affairs was reduced to less than half of its pre-1990 size, while the department dealing with internal affairs was enlarged to deal with increasing anti-Saddam activities within Iraq.

On 13 April 1993, the IIS planned and executed an assassination attempt against former US President George H. W. Bush and the Emir of Kuwait through the use of a large car bomb driven by two Iraqis.
However the plan was foiled and Kuwaiti officials arrested 16 persons suspected of carrying out the plot after a car bomb was found. Two Iraqi nationals, during the FBI interviews in Kuwait, admitted to attempting to carry out an attack under direction of the IIS.
On 26 June of that year, in response to an attempted assassination by IIS on former US President George H. W. Bush, US President Bill Clinton ordered two U.S. warships, namely USS Peterson and USS Chancellorsville, to fire Tomahawk cruise missiles on the IIS principal command and control complex in Baghdad. 16 of the 23 missiles hit their target; three struck a residential area, killing nine civilians and wounding 12. Four of the missiles were unaccounted for.

In June 1995, Saddam Hussein dismissed his stepbrother Sabawi Ibrahim al-Tikriti from his role as head of the IIS, due to his failure to increase domestic security within Iraq. Brigadier General  Ali Hasan al-Majid was named as his successor.

The IIS was officially dissolved on 23 May 2003 by the Administrator of the Coalition Provisional Authority of Iraq, L. Paul Bremer, per CPA Order Number 2.

Directors 
 Nadhim Kazar (1969–1973)
 Sadun Shakir Mahmud al-Tikriti (1973–1977)
 Barzan Ibrahim Hassan al-Tikriti (1977–1983)
 Hussein Kamel Hassan al-Majid (1983–1984)
 Fadhil al-Barraq Hussein al-Tikriti (1984–1989)
 Sabawi Ibrahim al-Tikriti (1989–1995)
 Ali Hassan Abd al-Majid al-Tikriti (1995–2003)

See also 
Barzan al-Tikriti
Law enforcement in Iraq
Directorate of General Security – Former internal Iraqi security agency
Directorate of General Military Intelligence – Former Iraqi military intelligence agency
Iraqi Special Security Organization – Former security agency responsible for security of VIP's
Iraqi National Intelligence Service – current intelligence agency

References

External links 
 Iraqi Intelligence Service
 Jihaz al-Mukhabarat al-Amma
 Agency profile: Iraqi intelligence
 US Army Foreign Military Studies Office Document
 Structure of the IIS
 How Do We Know that Iraq Tried to Assassinate President George H.W. Bush?
 So, Did Saddam Hussein Try to Kill Bush's Dad?
 Declassified Department of Defense document on U.S action against Iraq

Defunct Iraqi intelligence agencies
Organizations disestablished in 2003
Organizations of the 1991 uprisings in Iraq
Secret police
Organizations based in Baghdad